Digamasellidae is a family of mites in the order Mesostigmata.

Genera
These 11 genera belong to the family Digamasellidae:
 Dendrolaelaps Halbert, 1915
 Dendrolaelaspis Lindquist, 1975
 Dendroseius Karg, 1965
 Digamasellus Berlese, 1905
 Insectolaelaps Shcherbak, 1980
 Longoseius Chant, 1961
 Multidendrolaelaps Hirschmann, 1974
 Oligodentatus Shcherbak, 1980
 Orientolaelaps Bregetova & Shcherbak, 1977
 Panteniphis Willmann, 1949
 Pontiolaelaps Luxton, 1989

Uncertain placement
These species are considered incertae sedis within Digamasellidae:

 Asca muricata Fox, 1947
 Cyrtolaelaps armatus Berlese, 1904
 Digamasellus arcuatus Willmann, 1939
 Digamasellus gradatus Willmann, 1938
 Gamasellus inermis Halbert, 1920
 Gamasellus claviger Lombardini, 1941
 Gamasellus cultriger Lombardini, 1940
 Gamasellus gracilis Berlese, 1920
 Gamasellus innumerus Berlese, 1920
 Gamasellus rhodacaroides Berlese, 1920
 Gamasellus simplex Berlese, 1920
 Panteniphis rhombus Ma & Lin, 2007

References

 
Acari families